Mount Archer is a mountain and a rural locality in the Somerset Region, Queensland, Australia. In the  the locality of Mount Archer had a population of 305 people.

Geography 

Part of the northern boundary to the east is aligned with Neurum Creek, while in the west it roughly follows the Stanley River.

In the northwest of Mount Archer is a section of Somerset Dam. The north-eastern part has some rural residential and farming properties. The south of the locality is mountainous and heavily vegetated with parts protected within D'Aguilar National Park. This includes the peak of Mount Archer which marks the northern extent of the D'Aguilar Range.

History 
The mountain is called Buruja in the Kabi language. It means door.

The locality of Mount Archer takes its name from the mountain Mount Archer which in turn is named after three of the pioneer Archer brothers (John, David, and Thomas) who established the Durundur Station in the area. 

At the  the population of Mount Archer was included in the population statistics for the adjoining locality of Villeneuve, which recorded a population of 449.

In the  Mount Archer had a population of 305 people.

Education
There are no schools in Mount Archer. The nearest primary schools are Kilcoy State School in Kilcoy to the north-west, Woodford State School in Woodford to the north-east, and Mount Mee State School in neighbouring Mount Mee. The nearest secondary schools are Kilcoy State High School (to Year 12) in Kilcoy and Woodford State School (to Year 10) in Woodford.

References

External links

Suburbs of Somerset Region
Archer
Localities in Queensland